In theoretical physics, the NS5-brane is a five-dimensional p-brane that carries a magnetic charge under the B-field, the field under which the fundamental string is electrically charged.

References

String theory